Malling was a rural district in Kent, England which covered West Malling, East Malling, Snodland, Larkfield, Borough Green and Aylesford.

In 1974 the district was merged into the Borough of Tonbridge and Malling.

References

Rural districts of England